"Carry On Mentality" is a 7" vinyl single by Canadian singer-songwriter Hayden.  It was released in 1997 on Landspeed Records.

Track listing
All songs written by Paul Hayden Desser.

Side A:
"Carry On Mentality" – 3:43
Side B:
"Wasting My Days Away" – 4:50

Notes 

Hayden (musician) albums
1997 songs